This is a list of active Australian rules football leagues in Victoria and its active clubs as of 2015.

Victorian Football League

Box Hill
Casey
Coburg
Collingwood reserves
Essendon reserves
Footscray reserves
Frankston
Geelong reserves
Northern Blues
North Melbourne reserves
Port Melbourne
Richmond reserves
Sandringham
Werribee
Williamstown

Metropolitan Leagues

Victorian Amateur Football Association

AJAX
Albert Park
Aquinas
Beaumaris
Box Hill North
Bulleen Templestowe
Canterbury
Caulfield Grammarians
Chadstone
Collegians
De La Salle
Eley Park
Elsternwick
Fitzroy
Glen Eira
Hampton Rovers
Hawthorn
Ivanhoe
Kew
La Trobe University
Manningham
Marcellin
Masala
Mazenod
Melbourne HS
Monash Blues
Monash Gryphons
North Brunswick
North Old Boys/St Pats
Northern Blues
Oakleigh
Old Brighton
Old Camberwell
Old Carey
Old Geelong
Old Haileyburians
Old Ivanhoe
Old Melburnians
Old Mentonians
Old Paradians
Old Scotch
Old Trinity
Old Xaverians
Ormond
Parkdale Vultures
Parkside
PEGS
Peninsula
Powerhouse
Prahran-Assumption
Richmond Central
Rupertswood
South Melbourne Districts
South Mornington
St Bedes Mentone
St Bernards
St Francis Xavier
St Johns
St Kevins
St Leo's
St Mary's/Salesian
Swinburne University
Therry
University Blacks
University Blues
UHS/VUT
West Brunswick
Westbourne
Williamstown CYMS
Whitefriars
Yarra Valley

Eastern Football League

Balwyn
Bayswater
Blackburn
Boronia
Chirnside Park
Coldstream
Croydon
Doncaster
Doncaster East
Donvale
East Burwood
East Ringwood
Eastern Lions
Ferntree Gully
Forest Hill
Glen Waverley Hawks
Heathmont
Kilsyth
Knox
Lilydale
Mitcham
Montrose
Mooroolbark
Mulgrave
Noble Park
North Croydon
North Ringwood
Norwood
Nunawading
Park Orchards
Ringwood
Rowville
Scoresby
Silvan
South Belgrave
South Croydon
Surrey Park
Templestowe
The Basin
Upper Ferntree Gully
Vermont
Wantirna South
Warrandyte
Waverley Blues
Whitehorse Pioneers

Junior Clubs
Glen Waverley Rovers
Lysterfield FC
St Simons FC

Essendon District Football League

Aberfeldie
Airport West
Avondale Heights
Coburg Districts
Craigieburn
Doutta Stars
East Keilor
East Sunbury
Glenroy
Greenvale
Hadfield
Hillside Sharks
Jacana
Keilor
Keilor Park
Moonee Valley
Maribyrnong Park
Northern Saints
Oak Park
Pascoe Vale
Roxburgh Park
Strathmore
Sunbury Kangaroos
Taylors Lakes
Tullamarine
West Coburg
Westmeadows

Northern Football League

Banyule
Bundoora
Diamond Creek
Eltham
Eltham College
Epping
Fitzroy Stars
Greensborough
Heidelberg
Heidelberg West
Hurstbridge
Lalor
Lower Plenty
Macleod
Mernda
Montmorency
North Heidelberg
Northcote Park
Panton Hill
Reservoir
St Marys
South Morang
Thomastown
Watsonia
West Preston Lakeside
Whittlesea

Junior Clubs

Alphington
Keon Park
Lalor Stars
Mill Park
Preston RSL
Research
West Lalor
Yarrambat

Southern Football League

Ashwood
Bentleigh
Black Rock
Caulfield
Cerberus
Chelsea Heights
Cheltenham
Clayton
Dandenong
Dingley
Doveton Eagles
East Brighton
East Malvern
Endeavour Hills
Hallam
Hampton
Hampton Park
Heatherton
Highett
Keysborough
Lyndale
Lyndhurst
Moorabbin
Mordialloc
Mount Waverley
Murrumbeena
Oakleigh District
Port Colts
Sandown Cobras
Skye
South Yarra
Springvale District
St Kilda City
St Pauls – East Bentleigh

Western Region Football League

 Albanvale
 Albion
 Altona
 Braybrook
 Caroline Springs
 Deer Park
 Flemington Juniors
 Glenorden
 Hoppers Crossing
 Laverton
 Manor Lakes
 North Sunshine
 North Footscray
 Parkside
 Point Cook
 Point Cook Centrals
 Spotswood
 St Albans
 Sunshine
 Sunshine Heights
 Tarneit
 Werribee Districts
 West Footscray
 Suns
 Wyndhamvale
 Yarraville Seddon

Major Country Leagues

Ballarat Football League

 Bacchus Marsh
 Ballarat
 Darley
 East Point
 Lake Wendouree
 Melton
 Melton South
 North City
 Redan
 Sebastopol
 Sunbury

Bellarine Football League

Anglesea
Barwon Heads
Drysdale
Geelong Amateurs
Modewarre
Newcomb
Ocean Grove
Portarlington
Queenscliff
Torquay

Bendigo Football League

 Castlemaine
 Eaglehawk
 Gisborne
 Golden Square
 Kangaroo Flat
 Kyneton
 Maryborough
 Sandhurst
 South Bendigo
 Strathfieldsaye

Central Murray Football League

Balranald
Cohuna
Kerang
Koondrook-Barham
Lake Boga
Mallee Eagles
Nyah-Nyah West
Swan Hill
Tooleybuc-Manangatang
Tyntynder
Woorinen

Geelong Football League 

Bell Park
Colac
Geelong West Giants
Grovedale
Lara
Leopold
Newtown
North Shore
St Albans
St Mary's
St Josephs
South Barwon

Gippsland Football League

 Bairnsdale
 Drouin
 Leongatha
 Maffra
 Moe
 Morwell
 Sale
 Traralgon
 Warragul
 Wonthaggi Power

Goulburn Valley Football League

 Benalla
 Echuca
 Euroa
 Kyabram
 Mansfield
 Mooroopna
 Rochester
 Seymour
 Shepparton
 Shepparton Swans
 Shepparton United
 Tatura

Hampden Football League

 Camperdown
 Cobden
 Hamilton
 Koroit
 North Warrnambool
 Port Fairy
 Portland
 South Warrnambool
 Terang Mortlake
 Warrnambool

Mornington Peninsula Nepean Football League

 Bonbeach
 Chelsea
 Crib Point
 Devon Meadows
 Dromana
 Edithvale Aspendale
 Frankston Bombers
 Frankston YCW
 Hastings
 Karingal
 Langwarrin
 Mornington
 Mount Eliza
 Pearcedale
 Pines
 Red Hill
 Rosebud
 Rye
 Seaford
 Somerville
 Sorrento
 Tyabb

Murray Football League

 Barooga
 Cobram
 Congupna
 Deniliquin Rams
 Echuca United
 Finley
 Moama
 Mulwala
 Nathalia
 Numurkah
 Rumbalara
 Tongala

North Central Football League

 Birchip-Watchem
 Boort
 Charlton
 Donald
 Saint Arnaud
 Sea Lake Nandaly
 Wedderburn
 Wycheproof-Narraport

Outer East Football League

 Alexandra
 Beaconsfield
 Belgrave
 Berwick
 Cranbourne
 Doveton
 Emerald
 Gembrook-Cockatoo
 Healesville
 Kinglake
 Monbulk
 Mount Evelyn
 Narre Warren
 Olinda-Ferny Creek
 Officer
 Pakenham
 Powelltown
 Seville
 Thornton-Eildon
 Upwey-Tecoma
 Wandin
 Warburton-Millgrove
 Woori Yallock
 Yarra Glen
 Yarra Junction
 Yea

Ovens and Murray Football League

 Albury
 Corowa Rutherglen
 Lavington
 Myrtleford
 North Albury
 Wangaratta
 Wangaratta Rovers
 Wodonga
 Wodonga Raiders
 Yarrawonga

Sunraysia Football League

 Imperials
 Irymple
 Merbein
 Mildura
 Ouyen United
 Red Cliffs
 Robinvale
 South Mildura
 Wentworth Districts

Wimmera Football League

 Ararat
 Dimboola
 Horsham
 Horsham Saints
 Minyip-Murtoa
 Nhill
 Stawell
 Warracknabeal

District Country Leagues 
Central Highlands Football League
 Ballan
 Beaufort
 Bungaree
 Buninyong
 Carngham-Linton
 Clunes
 Creswick
 Daylesford
 Dunnstown
 Gordon
 Hepburn
 Learmonth
 Newlyn
 Rokewood-Corindhap
 Skipton
 Springbank
 Waubra

Colac and District Football League
 Alvie
 Apollo Bay
 Birregurra
 Colac Imperials
 Irrewarra-Beeac
 Lorne
 Simpson
 South Colac
 Otway Districts
 Western Eagles

East Gippsland Football League
 Boisdale Briagolong
 Lakes Entrance
 Lindenow
 Lucknow
 Orbost Snowy Rovers
 Paynesville
 Stratford
 Wy Yung

Ellinbank and District Football League
 Buln Buln
 Catani
 Ellinbank
 Lang Lang
 Longwarry
 Neerim Neerim South
 Nilma Darnum
 Nyora
 Poowong
 Trafalgar
 Yarragon

Geelong and District Football League
Anakie Roos
Bannockburn Tigers
Bell Post Hill Panthers
Belmont Lions
Corio Devils
East Geelong Eagles
Geelong West Giants
Inverleigh Hawks
North Geelong Magpies
Thomson Tigers
Winchelsea Blues
Werribee Centrals

Heathcote and District Football League
 Colbinabbin
 Elmore
 Heathcote
 Huntly
 Leitchville-Gunbower
 Lockington Bamawm United
 Mount Pleasant
 North Bendigo
 White Hills

Horsham and District Football League
 Edenhope-Apsley
 Harrow-Balmoral
 Jeparit Rainbow
 Kalkee
 Laharum
 Natimuk United
 Noradjuha-Quantong
 Pimpinio
 Rupanyup
 Southern Mallee
 Stawell Swifts
 Taylors Lake

Kyabram and District Football League
 Ardmona
 Avenel
 Girgarre
 Lancaster
 Longwood
 Merrigum
 Murchison
 Nagambie
 Rushworth
 Stanhope
 Tallygaroopna
 Undera
 Violet Town

Loddon Valley Football League
 Bears Lagoon-Serpentine
 Bridgewater
 Calivil United
 Inglewood
 Marong & District
 Mitiamo
 Newbridge
 Pyramid Hill
 YCW

Maryborough Castlemaine District Football League
 Avoca
 Campbells Creek
 Carisbrook
 Dunolly
 Harcourt
 Lexton
 Maldon
 Maryborough Rovers
 Natte-Bealiba
 Navarre
 Newstead
 Royal Park
 Talbot
 Trentham

Mid Gippsland Football League
 Boolarra
 Hill End
 Mirboo North
 Morwell East
 Newborough
 Thorpdale
 Yinnar

Millewa Football League
 Bambill
 Cardross
 Gol Gol Hawks
 Meringur
 Nangiloc
 Werrimull

Mininera and District Football League
 Ararat Eagles
 Caramut
 Glenthompson-Dunkeld
 Great Western
 Hawkesdale-Macarthur
 Lismore-Derrinallum
 Moyston-Willaura
 Penshurst
 SMW Rovers
 Tatyoon
 Wickliffe-Lake Bolac
 Woorndoo-Mortlake

North Gippsland Football League
 Churchill
 Cowwarr
 Glengarry
 Gormandale
 Heyfield
 Rosedale
 Sale City
 Traralgon Tyers United
 Woodside
 Yarram

Omeo and District Football League
 Bruthen
 Buchan
 Lindenow South
 Omeo-Benambra
 Swan Reach
 Swifts Creek

Ovens and King Football League
 Benalla All Blacks
 Bonnie Doon
 Bright
 Glenrowan
 Goorambat
 Greta
 King Valley
 Milawa
 Moyhu
 North Wangaratta
 Tarrawingee
 Whorouly

Picola and District Football League
 Berrigan
 Blighty
 Deniliquin Rovers
 Dookie United
 Jerilderie
 Katamatite
 Katandra
 Katunga
 Mathoura
 Picola
 Rennie
 Shepparton East
 Strathmerton
 Tocumwal
 Tungamah
 Waaia
 Yarroweyah

Riddell District Football League
 Diggers Rest
 Lancefield
 Macedon
 Melton Central
 Riddell
 Rockbank
 Romsey
 Wallan
 Woodend-Hesket

South West District Football League
 Branxholme-Wallacedale
 Cavendish
 Coleraine
 Dartmoor
 Heathmere
 Heywood
 Tyrendarra
 Westerns

Tallangatta and District Football League
 Barnawartha
 Beechworth
 Chiltern
 Dederang-Mt. Beauty
 Kiewa-Sandy Creek
 Mitta United
 Rutherglen
 Tallangatta
 Thurgoona
 Wahgunyah
 Wodonga Saints
 Yackandandah

Upper Murray Football League
 Border-Walwa
 Bullioh
 Corryong
 Cudgewa
 Federal
 Tumbarumba

Warrnambool and District Football League
 Allansford
 Dennington
 East Warrnambool
 Kolora Noorat
 Merrivale
 Nirranda
 Old Collegians
 Panmure
 Russell's Creek
 South Rovers
 Timboon

West Gippsland Football League
 Bunyip
 Cora Lynn Cobras
 Dalyston
 Garfield
 Inverloch-Kongwak
 Kilcunda-Bass
 Koo Wee Rup
 Korumburra-Bena
 Nar Nar Goon
 Phillip Island
 Tooradin – Dalmore
 Warragul Industrials

Western Border Football League
 Casterton-Sandford
 East Gambier
 Millicent
 North Gambier
 South Gambier
 West Gambier

Junior Football Leagues
Albury Wodonga Junior Football League
Ballarat Junior Football League
Bendigo Junior Football League
Central Gippsland Junior Football League
Frankston and Districts Junior Football League
Riddell District Junior Football League
Saturday Football League
Seymour & District Junior Football League
Shepparton Junior Football Football League
South East Metro Junior Football League
Traralgon & District Junior Football League
Wangaratta & District Junior Football League
Warragul & District Junior Football League
Yarra Junior Football League

Victoria